Premada Kanike is a 1976 Indian Kannada-language romantic thriller film directed by V. Somashekhar and written by the duo Salim–Javed. It was produced by Jayadevi under the banner of Jayadevi films. The film starred Rajkumar, Aarathi and Jayamala in lead roles with Vajramuni and Rajashankar in supporting roles. The plot follows a teacher and her nephew hired by rich family to teach their daughter. One day she witnesses a murder in a train and discovers that the murderer is the father of her student.

The story of the film was written by the acclaimed duo Salim–Javed who made their South Indian debut as original story writers for which they rehashed the story of the 1969 film Do Bhai by retaining only the core plotline which was originally credited only to Salim Khan under the name of Prince Salim. This was Salim-Javed's first release after Sholay. The film also marked the onscreen debuts of Rajkumar's children - Lohith and Poornima Rajkumar. It was remade in Tamil in 1980 as Polladhavan and in Hindi in 1981 as Raaz.

The film, upon release was declared a blockbuster at the box-office and has attained a cult status for all the crime-thriller genre films. The movie is noted for merging romantic story with thriller genre. It was appreciated for having redefined the thriller genre in the industry. The film saw a theatrical run of 25 weeks. The songs composed by Upendra Kumar were received extremely well and considered as evergreen hits. It went on to win multiple awards and accolades including the Karnataka State Film Award for Best Film.

Plot 
Seetha, a young woman, is travelling via train with her nephew Raju to an estate to attend her job interview as a nanny to the estate merchant Manohar's daughter. Her co-passenger is shot dead by someone. Seetha sees the murderer and clearly remembers his face and reports the murder to Moorthy, a police inspector. Then she is appointed for the nanny position and she and Manohar's daughter Shoba grow fond of each other. Manohar, who is extremely fond of his daughter returns from his journey. Seetha meets him, only to realize that he is the murderer she saw on the train. Manohar threatens Seetha not to tell anyone and makes sure to prevent her from leaving his estate as she is keen on reporting him to the police.

Seetha tries many times to escape but is always caught. She does not even tell the police when she meets them as Manohar threatens to kill Raju if she did. Later, Seetha somehow sees beneath the rough, mean Manohar and grows fond of him but is confused why such a nice man is acting so arrogantly. In flashbacks, Manohar and Kumudha fell in love and married, shortly thereafter their daughter Shoba was born. Kumudha's uncle Chandru, who was eager to marry Kumudha was sent to jail by Manohar as he tried to kill both Manohar and Kumudha. He was released from jail as his term had finished. When Manohar was out of house, Kumudha is killed by Chandru, she commits suicide and Manohar wants to die with her but she makes him vow that he will get revenge on Chandru for separating them and to take care of Shoba well. Manohar also reveals that the man killed on the train was Chandru.

Seetha now understands his acts and vows not to tell anyone. Moorthy's colleague is curious about Seetha; she said that she remembered the face and was eager to find the murderer, but now she had told him she has forgotten the face, hence he suspects Seetha to be the murderer, and Moorthy agrees with his belief. On Shoba's birthday, Manohar is to announce that he is to hand over all his wealth to Seetha and surrender to the police, but before this the police arrive and try to arrest Seetha. Manohar saves her by confessing to the murder and went to trail explained his actions but a crippled assassin arrives at the court and tells the truth about Chandru's death and reveals himself as Kumudha's brother. He says goodbye to Shobha and Manohar as Seetha and Manohar lived together as family, along with Shobha and Raju

Cast 

 Rajkumar  as Manohar
 Aarathi as Sita
 Jayamala as Kumudha
 Vajramuni as Murthy
 Rajashankar
 Balakrishna
 Sampath
 Thoogudeepa Srinivas as Ashok
Puneeth Rajkumar (credited as Master Lohith) and Baby Poornima Rajkumar as Shobha

Production 
Large portions of the film were extensively shot in the Kashmir valley. This was rare for a Kannada film of 1970s due to the elevation of production costs which such a location could have caused then.

Soundtrack 

Upendra Kumar composed the music for the soundtracks and lyrics were penned by Chi. Udaya Shankar and Vijaya Narasimha.

Awards 
1975–76 Karnataka State Film Awards
 Best Film
 Best Dialogue writer — Chi. Udaya Shankar
 Best Editing — P. Bhaktavatsalam
 Best Child Actress — Poornima Rajkumar

References

External links 
 

1976 films
1970s Kannada-language films
Indian crime thriller films
Indian films about revenge
Kannada films remade in other languages
1970s crime thriller films
Films scored by Upendra Kumar
Films directed by V. Somashekhar
Films with screenplays by Salim–Javed
Indian rape and revenge films